Rajat Manohar Patidar (born 1 June 1993) is an Indian cricketer. He plays for Madhya Pradesh in domestic cricket and for the Royal Challengers Bangalore in the Indian Premier League. He is a right-handed top order batter and off-spinner.

Early life
Patidar was born on 1 June 1993 in Indore, Madhya Pradesh. His father is a businessman. He joined a cricket club when he was 8 years old and was later enrolled into an academy by his grandfather. He started his career as a bowler and started concentrating on batting after his U-15 levels.

Education 
Patidar attended New Digamber Public School in Indore where he completed his primary and secondary education. He later graduated from Indore University.

Career
He made his first-class debut on 30 October 2015 in the 2015–16 Ranji Trophy. He made his Twenty20 debut for Madhya Pradesh in the 2017–18 Zonal T20 League on 8 January 2018.

He was the leading run-scorer for Madhya Pradesh in the 2018–19 Ranji Trophy, with 713 runs in eight matches. In August 2019, he was named in the India Blue team's squad for the 2019–20 Duleep Trophy.

In February 2021, Patidar was bought by the Royal Challengers Bangalore in the IPL auction ahead of the 2021 Indian Premier League. He managed to score only 71 runs in the four games he played and was subsequently released ahead of the 2022 Indian Premier League.

Patidar went unsold in the 2022 IPL Player Auction. Later, Patidar was signed by Royal Challengers Bangalore mid-season as a replacement for the injured Luvnith Sisodia for INR 20 Lakhs. On 25 May 2022, in the Eliminator match in the 2022 Indian Premier League, Patidar scored a match winning knock of 112* (54) against Lucknow Super Giants. This proved to be a record-breaking innings for Patidar, as he became the first uncapped player to score a century in the playoffs stage of the Indian Premier League. This was also the joint-fastest century (49 balls) by a player in the playoffs stage, he equaled the record of Wridhiman Saha, who also scored a 49 ball century for the Kings XI Punjab (now Punjab Kings) in the 2014 IPL Finals. Patidar ended the 2022 season with 333 runs scored in just 8 matches at an average of 55.50 with the help of a century and 2 half-centuries. Ahead of the 2023 Indian Premier League he was retained by Royal Challengers Bangalore.

As a result of a phenomenal domestic season and his performances in 2022 IPL season, Patidar was named in the One-Day International (ODI) squad for the series against South Africa in the month of October. Later in February 2023 he was named in the ODI squad against New Zealand as an injury replacement for Shreyas Iyer. However he failed to make it to the playing eleven on both the occasions and is yet to make his international debut.

Net Worth 
Patidar’s net worth is estimated to be between 1-2 Crores in Indian Rupees. This money has come from sources such as endorsements, match fees, and investments.

References

External links
 

1993 births
Living people
Indian cricketers
Madhya Pradesh cricketers
People from Madhya Pradesh
Royal Challengers Bangalore cricketers